High-level synthesis (HLS), sometimes referred to as C synthesis, electronic system-level (ESL) synthesis, algorithmic synthesis, or behavioral synthesis, is an automated design process that takes an abstract behavioral specification of a digital system and finds a register-transfer level structure that realizes the given behavior.

Synthesis begins with a high-level specification of the problem, where behavior is generally decoupled from low-level circuit mechanics such as clock-level timing. Early HLS explored a variety of input specification languages, although recent research and commercial applications generally accept synthesizable subsets of ANSI C/C++/SystemC/MATLAB. The code is analyzed, architecturally constrained, and scheduled to transcompile into a register-transfer level (RTL) design in a hardware description language (HDL), which is in turn commonly synthesized to the gate level by the use of a logic synthesis tool.

The goal of HLS is to let hardware designers efficiently build and verify hardware, by giving them better control over optimization of their design architecture, and through the nature of allowing the designer to describe the design at a higher level of abstraction while the tool does the RTL implementation. Verification of the RTL is an important part of the process.

Hardware can be designed at varying levels of abstraction. The commonly used levels of abstraction are gate level, register-transfer level (RTL), and algorithmic level.

While logic synthesis uses an RTL description of the design, high-level synthesis works at a higher level of abstraction, starting with an algorithmic description in a high-level language such as SystemC and ANSI C/C++. The designer typically develops the module functionality and the interconnect protocol. The high-level synthesis tools handle the micro-architecture and transform untimed or partially timed functional code into fully timed RTL implementations, automatically creating cycle-by-cycle detail for hardware implementation. The (RTL) implementations are then used directly in a conventional logic synthesis flow to create a gate-level implementation.

History
Early academic work extracted scheduling, allocation, and binding as the basic steps for high-level-synthesis. Scheduling partitions the algorithm in control steps that are used to define the states in the finite-state machine. Each control step contains one small section of the algorithm that can be performed in a single clock cycle in the hardware. Allocation and binding maps the instructions and variables to the hardware components, multiplexers, registers and wires of the data path.

First generation behavioral synthesis was introduced by Synopsys in 1994 as Behavioral Compiler and used Verilog or VHDL as input languages. The abstraction level used was partially timed (clocked) processes. Tools based on behavioral Verilog or VHDL were not widely adopted in part because neither languages nor the partially timed abstraction were well suited to modeling behavior at a high level. 10 years later, in early 2004, Synopsys end-of-lifed Behavioral Compiler.

In 1998, Forte Design Systems introduced its Cynthesizer tool which used SystemC as an entry language instead of Verilog or VHDL.  Cynthesizer was adopted by many Japanese companies in 2000 as Japan had a very mature SystemC user community.  The first high-level synthesis tapeout was achieved in 2001 by Sony using Cynthesizer. Adoption in the United States started in earnest in 2008.

Source input
The most common source inputs for high-level synthesis are based on standard languages such as ANSI C/C++, SystemC and MATLAB.

High-level synthesis typically also includes a bit-accurate executable specification as input, since to derive an efficient hardware implementation, additional information is needed on what is an acceptable Mean-Square Error or Bit-Error Rate etc. For example, if the designer starts with an FIR filter written using the "double" floating type, before he can derive an efficient hardware implementation, they need to perform numerical refinement to arrive at a fixed-point implementation. The refinement requires additional information on the level of quantization noise that can be tolerated, the valid input ranges etc. This bit-accurate specification makes the high level synthesis source specification functionally complete.
Normally the tools infer from the high level code a Finite State Machine and a Datapath that implement arithmetic operations.

Process stages
The high-level synthesis process consists of a number of activities. Various high-level synthesis tools perform these activities in different orders using different algorithms. Some high-level synthesis tools combine some of these activities or perform them iteratively to converge on the desired solution.
 Lexical processing
 Algorithm optimization
 Control/Dataflow analysis
 Library processing
 Resource allocation
 Scheduling
 Functional unit binding
 Register binding
 Output processing
 Input Rebundling

Functionality
In general, an algorithm can be performed over many clock cycles with few hardware resources, or over fewer clock cycles using a larger number of ALUs, registers and memories.  Correspondingly, from one algorithmic description, a variety of hardware microarchitectures can be generated by an HLS compiler according to the directives given to the tool.  This is the same trade off of execution speed for hardware complexity as seen when a given program is run on conventional processors of differing performance, yet all running at roughly the same clock frequency.

Architectural constraints
Synthesis constraints for the architecture can automatically be applied based on the design analysis. These constraints can be broken into
 Hierarchy
 Interface
 Memory
 Loop
 Low-level timing constraints
 Iteration

Interface synthesis
Interface Synthesis refers to the ability to accept pure C/C++ description as its input, then use automated interface synthesis technology to control the timing and communications protocol on the design interface. This enables interface analysis and exploration of a full range of hardware interface options such as streaming, single- or dual-port RAM plus various handshaking mechanisms. With interface synthesis the designer does not embed interface protocols in the source description. Examples might be: direct connection, one line, 2 line handshake, FIFO.

Vendors
Data reported on recent Survey

 MATLAB HDL Coder  from Mathworks
 HLS-QSP from CircuitSutra Technologies
 C-to-Silicon from Cadence Design Systems
 Concurrent Acceleration from Concurrent EDA
 Symphony C Compiler from Synopsys
 QuickPlay from PLDA
 PowerOpt from ChipVision
 Cynthesizer from Forte Design Systems (now Stratus HLS from Cadence Design Systems)
 Catapult C from Calypto Design Systems, part of Mentor Graphics as of 2015, September 16
 PipelineC 
 CyberWorkBench from NEC
 Mega Hardware 
 C2R from CebaTech
 CoDeveloper from Impulse Accelerated Technologies
 HercuLeS by Nikolaos Kavvadias
 PICO from Synfora, acquired by Synopsys in June 2010 (PICO = Program In/Code Out)
 xPilot from University of California, Los Angeles
 Vsyn from vsyn.ru
 ngDesign from SynFlow

See also
C to HDL
Electronic design automation (EDA)
Electronic system-level (ESL)
Logic synthesis
High-level verification (HLV)
SystemVerilog
Hardware acceleration

References

Further reading
 
 
 
 
 
  covers the use of C/C++, SystemC, TML and even UML

External links

 Vivado HLS course on Youtube
 Deepchip Discussion Forum

Electronic design automation
Hardware acceleration